For the minor league ice hockey player, see Kerry Clark (ice hockey).

Peter Kerry Clark  (born 30 June 1949) is New Zealand lawn bowls player and administrator.

Early life and family
Born in Cromwell on 30 June 1949, Clark was educated at Cromwell District High School from 1961 to 1965. He married his wife, Suzanne, in 1990, and the couple have one child.

Playing career
Clark began playing bowls in Cromwell as a 12-year-old, and represented New Zealand at the 1972 world championships. At the 1974 British Commonwealth Games he won the men's fours gold medal, partnering David Baldwin, Gordon Jolly and John Somerville. At the following 1978 Commonwealth Games he came fourth in the men's singles. He made his final international appearance for New Zealand in 1980.

Administration
Between 1982 and 1986, Clark was the convenor of the national men's selection panel, and was involved in the organisation of the 1988 World Outdoor Bowls Championship in Auckland. He served as president of the International Bowling Board for two years. When the New Zealand men's and women's bowls associations amalgamated to form Bowls New Zealand in 1996, Clark was appointed as that body's inaugural chief executive. He announced his retirement in 2016.

Clark became chair of the World Bowls laws committee in 2004, and also chaired the organisation of the 2008 World Outdoor Bowls Championship held in Christchurch. He was chair of the New Zealand Sports Turf Institute between 1997 and 2011, and was the World Bowls technical delegate for the 2014 Commonwealth Games in Glasgow..Clark also Chaired the organisation of the 2016 World Outdoor Championships in Christchurch.

A trustee of the Halberg Disability Foundation since 1996, Clark was made a life trustee in 2016.

Honours
In the 1989 Queen's Birthday Honours, Clark was appointed an Officer of the Order of the British Empire, for services to bowls. In 2013, he was an inaugural inductee into the Bowls New Zealand Hall of Fame. Clark was appointed a Companion of the New Zealand Order of Merit for services to bowls in the 2017 Queen's Birthday Honours.
Awarded the Order of Merit by the Commonwealth Games Federation at the CGF General Assembly in April 2018 for services to Lawn Bowls

References

1949 births
Living people
People from Cromwell, New Zealand
New Zealand male bowls players
Commonwealth Games gold medallists for New Zealand
Bowls players at the 1974 British Commonwealth Games
Bowls players at the 1978 Commonwealth Games
New Zealand Officers of the Order of the British Empire
Commonwealth Games medallists in lawn bowls
New Zealand sports executives and administrators
Companions of the New Zealand Order of Merit
Medallists at the 1974 British Commonwealth Games